The 2020–21 Football Championship of Dnipropetrovsk Oblast was won by Skoruk Tomakivka.

League table

References

Football
Dnipropetrovsk